George Bruno Money (born 17 July 1942) is an English vocalist, keyboardist and bandleader. He is best known for his playing of the Hammond organ and association with his Big Roll Band. Inspired by Jerry Lee Lewis and Ray Charles, he was drawn to rock and roll music and became a leading light in the vibrant music scene of Bournemouth and Soho during the 1960s. He took his stage name 'Zoot' from Zoot Sims after seeing him in concert.

Money has been associated with The Animals, Eric Burdon, Peter Green, Steve Marriott, Kevin Coyne, Kevin Ayers, Humble Pie, Alexis Korner, Snowy White, Mick Taylor, Spencer Davis, Vivian Stanshall, Geno Washington, Brian Friel, the Hard Travelers, Widowmaker, Georgie Fame and Alan Price. He is also known as a bit part and character actor.

Music career

Big Roll Band and Dantalian's Chariot
In autumn 1961 Money formed the Big Roll Band with himself as vocalist, Roger Collis on lead guitar, pianist Al Kirtley (later of Trendsetters Limited), bassist Mike "Monty" Montgomery and drummer Johnny Hammond. Their first public performance was on Sunday 12 November 1961 at Bournemouth's Downstairs Club. In 1962 drummer Pete Brookes replaced Hammond at the same time as bassist Johnny King replaced Montgomery and tenor sax player Kevin Drake joined the band. Kirtley left shortly afterwards, Money taking over on organ.

Under its later line-up of Money on organ and vocals, Andy Summers, who later became a member of The Police, on guitar, Nick Newall and Clive Burrows (and later Johnny Almond) on saxophones, Paul Williams on bass and occasional vocals, and Colin Allen on drums, the Big Roll Band played soul, jazz and R&B, moving with musical trends as the now established R&B movement moved into the Swinging Sixties and became associated with the burgeoning "Soho scene". Money's antics as a flamboyant frontman were a feature of the band's act. During 1964 the Big Roll Band started playing regularly at the Flamingo Club in Soho, London until Money joined Alexis Korner's Blues Incorporated. On 17 September 1966 Money with the band reached #25 in the U.K singles charts, with "Big Time Operator".

In July 1967 the Big Roll Band became Dantalian's Chariot and in spite of a lack of chart success as such, the band found itself at the heart of a new counterculture, sharing concert line-ups with Pink Floyd, Soft Machine and the Crazy World of Arthur Brown. A single, "Madman Running Through the Fields", was released in 1967 and in April 1968 Dantalian's Chariot was disbanded.

The album Chariot Rising was released in 1996, comprising both sides of the 1967 single together with eight other unreleased studio recordings. It is available on CD.

1968–1978
During 1968, Money moved to the United States to join Eric Burdon & the New Animals in time for their Every One of Us album; the group soon incorporated stretched-out, heavily-psychedelic versions of Dantalian's Chariot favourites "Madman Running Through the Fields" and "Gemini" into their setlist. Money's erstwhile Big Roll Band and Dantalian's Chariot colleague Andy Summers also soon joined them for the recording of the album Love Is in late 1968, but The New Animals broke up shortly afterwards. Money then took time out to record and release his solo LP Welcome To My Head in 1969. Having returned to the U.K. by June 1970, Money contributed piano to the improvised studio session led by former Fleetwood Mac guitarist Peter Green, which led to Green's release of the experimental The End of the Game. During the 1970s he played and recorded with the poetry and rock band Grimms, Ellis, Centipede, Kevin Ayers and Kevin Coyne.

Solo album and Majik Mijits
Money signed to Paul McCartney's record label MPL Communications in 1980 and recorded Mr. Money produced by Jim Diamond. During 1981 Steve Marriott and Ronnie Lane formed a band with Money, bass player Jim Leverton, drummer Dave Hynes and saxophone player Mel Collins to record the album The Majic Mijits. The album features songs by Lane and Marriott but due to Lane's multiple sclerosis, they were unable to tour to promote it. It was eventually released nineteen years later.

1987–1998
In 1987 Money was Musical Director for the BBC Scotland drama series Tutti Frutti and wrote the theme music. In 1985 he wrote the incidental music for five episodes of the TV series Adventures Beyond Belief. From 1990 to 1994 he was music controller for Melody Radio. In 1994 Money recorded with Alan Price and the Electric Blues Company alongside vocalist and guitarist Bobby Tench, bassist Peter Grant and drummer Martin Wild, on A Gigster's Life for Me. He continued to appear with Price at live appearances in the UK. The Dantalian's Chariot album Chariot Rising was released in 1997, thirty years after it was recorded. (produced and re-mastered by Gary Whitford). In 1998 Money produced Ruby Turner's album Call Me by My Name,

2002–2005
Money produced the Woodstock Taylor album Road Movie (2002), also contributing keyboards. In 2002 he recorded tracks with Humble Pie for their album Back on Track released by Sanctuary Records. In 2003 Money featured on the British Legends of Rhythm and Blues UK tour, alongside Long John Baldry, Ray Dorset and Paul Williams. Money joined Pete Goodall to re-record the Thunderclap Newman UK hit single Something in the Air (2004) written by John "Speedy" Keene, which featured the last recorded performance by saxophonist Dick Heckstall-Smith. In 2005 Money joined Goodall to record a CD of new songs by Goodall and Pete Brown. They went on to tour the UK under the name of Good Money. In early 2006 Money and drummer Colin Allen joined vocalist Maggie Bell, bassist Colin Hodgkinson and guitarist Miller Anderson, in the British Blues Quintet.

2008–present
He appeared with the RD Crusaders for the Teenage Cancer Trust at the 'London International Music Show', on 15 June 2008. In 2009 he appeared with Maggie Bell, Bobby Tench, Chris Farlowe and Alan Price, in the 'Maximum Rhythm and Blues Tour' of thirty two British theatres. Money Joined the British Blues All Stars in 2014 and has appeared his Big Roll Band at The Bull's Head music venue in Barnes, London  and elsewhere.

Acting career
He began attracting acting roles in the 1970s and started a parallel acting career with character appearances in film and TV dramas.

Film appearances
 Red Hair, one of Leonard Rossiter's fellow commuters, in the 1978 short film The Waterloo Bridge Handicap
 Lotterby in the 1979 film Porridge
 a promotions man in the 1980 UK film Breaking Glass
 a music-publishing executive in the 1981 Madness film Take It or Leave It
 Dorking, alongside Eddie Kidd in the 1981 film Riding High
 Chalky White in the 1983 film Bullshot
 a pirate in the 1983 film The Pirates of Penzance
 a party guest in the 1984 film Supergirl
 the first taxi driver in the 1984 film Scandalous
 Supersonic Sam in the 1985 film Billy the Kid and the Green Baize Vampire
 Chez Nobody Barman in the 1986 film Absolute Beginners

In 2000 he starred in a film based on guitarist Syd Barrett, as a fanatical fan stalking the rock star Roger Bannerman in the underground cult film Remember a Day.

TV appearances
Sometimes credited as G.B. Money or G.B, he has appeared in a number of other small roles in British television programmes including ‘’Rutland Weekend Television (season 1, episode 4) with John Halsey as The Fabulous Bingo Brothers, Bergerac, The Professionals, Shoestring, Big Deal, The Bill, London's Burning, The Piglet Files and EastEnders. In 1989 he played a New Age Traveller in the ITV drama Forever Green. In 1992 and 1993 he appeared in the BBC sitcom Get Back as a dim but well meaning family friend 'Bungalow Bill' alongside Ray Winstone, Larry Lamb and Kate Winslet.

Discography with The Big Roll Band
See Zoot Money's Big Roll Band for his discography as bandleader.

Solo discography
Transition. Columbia (1968)
Welcome to My Head  Capitol (1969),
Zoot Money Polydor (1970)
Mr. Money. MPL (1980) 
Were You There Live. Indigo  (1999)
Full Clothed & Naked. Indigo (2000)
As & Bs Scrapbook. Repertoire (2003) 
A Big Time Operator. Castle (2005)
Full Circle. Universal distribution (2007)
The Book Of Life... I've Read It. Treasure Island (2016)

Discography as a sideman
Albums
 
Alan Price
I Put a Spell on You and Other Great Hits. CMC International/Sanctuary (2003)
Alan Price and The Electric Blues Company
A Gigster's Life for Me. Indigo (1996) 
Alexis Korner
Accidentally Born in New Orleans’’ (1973)Alexis Korner (1973)Mr. Blues. Toadstool (1974)White & Blue Alexis Korner	(1980)The Party Album. Intercord  (1980)	Alexis Korner and Friends. Amiga (1982)Alexis Korner 1972-1983 (1992)Alexis Korner Memorial Concert Vol2 (1995)Musically Rich...And Famous: Anthology 1967-1982. Castle (1998)	
Alvin Lee 	
’’Let It Rock’’. Repertoire (1978)
’’The Anthology ’’ (2002)
Andy RobertsUrban Cowboy (1971) Andy Roberts & the Great Stampede. Elektra (1973)Nina and the Dream Tree.Pegasus/Philips (1971) 	
The AnimalsArk. CBS (1983)Greatest Hits Live!. IRS (2007)
 Brian Friel	Arrivederci Ardrossan (1975)Ashes & Matchsticks (1976)
The British Blues QuintetLive in Glasgow. Angel Air (2007)	
CentipedeSeptober Energy. RCA (1971)
Dantalian's ChariotChariot Rising. Wooden Hill (1996)
Eddie HarrisE.H. in the U.K. Atlantic (1973)Sold out (1974)Collectables Classics [Box Set] Eddie Harris  (2006)Only the Best of Eddie Harris Vol1	(2009)
EllisRiding on the Crest of a Slump. Epic (1972)Why not?. Epic (1973)
Eric BurdonSurvivor . Polydor (1978)Good Times: A Collection Eric Burdon (1993)
Eric Burdon and the AnimalsThe Twain Shall Meet. MGM (1968) 	Love Is. MGM (1968)Every One Of Us. MGM (1968)The Best of Eric Burdon & the Animals 1966-1968. Polydor (1991)	
Marc EllingtonRestoration. Philips (1972) 
GrimmsRocking Duck. Island (1973)Grimms. Island (1973)Sleepers. DJM (1976)
Johnny Almond Music MachinePatent Pending. Deram (1969)
Jim DiamondDouble Crossed. Cherry Pop (2009)
Georgie FameCharlestons. Three Line Whip (2007)The Birthday Big Band (1998 55th-birthday concert). Three Line Whip (2007)	
Kevin AyersYes We Have No Mañanas, So Get Your Mañanas Today. EMI (1976)Too Old to Die Young: BBC Live 1972-1976. Hux (1998)The BBC Sessions 1970-1976. Hux (2005)	
Kevin CoyneIn Living Black & White. EMI (1976)	Heart Burn. Virgin (1976)Dynamite Daze. EMI(1978)Babble. Virgin (1979)On air Tradition & Moderne (2008)I Want My Crown: The Anthology 1973-1980. EMI (2010)Live At Rockpalast 1979. 2CDs + DVD - Mig Music/Indigo (2019; also previous editions without video, by other publishers.)
Humble PieBack on Track. Sanctuary (2002) 	
Juicy Lucy	Pieces. Polydor (1972)
LaTourHome on the Range. Smash (1993 )	
Long John Baldry	Good To Be Alive. Casablanca (1973)
Lonnie DoneganPutting on the Style (1977)
Mike McGearWoman. Island (1972)
Peter Green.The End of the Game. Warner Bros. (1970)The Anthology (2008)
Pete York Pete York & Friends. Inakustik (2007)
Roger McGoughA Summer with Monika. Island (1979)
Ruby Turner	Call Me by My Name. Indigo (1998)
The ScaffoldFresh Liver. Island (1973)
Spencer Davis	Extremely Live at Birmingham Town Hall. Inakustik/Inak Records (1995)
Thunderclap NewmanPick N Tell (2006)  	
Widowmaker (U.K)Widowmaker. United Artists (1976)Straight Faced Fighters. Sanctuary (2002)	

Singles discography
The Uncle Willie. Decca (1964) 
I Really Learnt How To Cry. Columbia (1967)		
No One But You. Polydor. (1970)		
Your Feets Too Big. Magic Moon Records (1980)

Other discography
Inclusion on Various Artist compilationsRattlesnake Guitar: The Music of Peter Green. Viceroy (1996)The Blues Scene. Decca  (1996)		Mod Scene Vol2. Polygram  (1996)	Peter Green Songbook. Seagull (2000)Confessin' the Blues. Indigo (1997)Fresh Blues Vol2. In-Akustik (1998)The R&B Scene. Deram (1998)Indigo All-Star Swing & Dance Party. Indigo (1999)Indigo Blues Collection Vol6. Indigo (2001)Story of Transatlantic Records. Metro Doubles (2003)Instro Hipsters a Go-Go Vol2. Psychic Circle   (2003)Hammond Heroes: 60s R&B Organ Grooves. Ace (2005)This Is Mod. Castle (2006)Goodbye Nashville, Hello Camden Town: A Pub Rock Anthology. Castle (2007)The In Crowd: Original Mod Classics. Castle Pulse (2007)		This Is the Blues Vol2. Eagle (2010)Electric Psychedelic Sitar Headswirlers Vol11. Particles (2012)

Notes

References
 Hewitt, Paulo and Hellier, John. Steve Marriott – All Too Beautiful...''. Helter Skelter (2004).

External links

1942 births
Living people
English pianists
English blues musicians
English rock keyboardists
English male film actors
English male television actors
The Animals members
Musicians from Bournemouth
British rhythm and blues boom musicians
Centipede (band) members
Grimms members